Firuzabad District is a district (bakhsh) in Kermanshah County, Kermanshah Province, Iran. At the 2006 census, its population was 24,849, in 5,219 families.  The District has one city: Halashi. The District has three rural districts (dehestan): Jalalvand Rural District, Osmanvand Rural District, and Sar Firuzabad Rural District.

References 

Kermanshah County
Districts of Kermanshah Province